Dear Independence is the second album by the Danish blues rock group The Blue Van, released in 2006 under TVT Records. The track "Independence" is featured in the opening sequence of the USA TV show Royal Pains.

Track listing
The Odyssey (2:42)
Don't Leave Me Blue (3:31)
Independence (2:59)
The Poet Tree (3:28)
Goldmind (3:26)
Momentarily Sane (2:59)
The Scent Of Seasons (3:38)
The Time Is Right (2:53)
Keep Me Running (2:47)
Elephant Man (2:32)
Rico (3:42)
White Domino's (4:44)

References

2006 albums
The Blue Van albums